Karen Gay Silkwood (February 19, 1946 – November 13, 1974) was an American chemical technician and labor union activist known for raising concerns about corporate practices related to health and safety in a nuclear facility. 

She worked at the Kerr-McGee Cimarron Fuel Fabrication Site in Oklahoma, making plutonium pellets, and became the first woman on the union's negotiating team. After testifying to the Atomic Energy Commission about her concerns, she was found to have plutonium contamination on her person and in her home. While driving to meet with a New York Times journalist and an official of her union's national office, she died in a car crash under unclear circumstances.

Her family sued Kerr-McGee for the plutonium contamination. The company settled out of court for US $1.38 million, while not admitting liability. Her story was chronicled in Mike Nichols's 1983 Academy Award nominated film Silkwood in which she was portrayed by Meryl Streep.

Family 
Karen Gay Silkwood was born in Longview, Texas, and raised in Nederland, Texas. She had two sisters, Linda and Rosemary. She attended Lamar University in Beaumont, Texas. In 1965, she married William Meadows, an oil pipeline worker, with whom she had three children. Following the couple's bankruptcy due to Meadows' overspending and in the face of Meadows' refusal to end an extramarital affair, Silkwood left him in 1972 and moved to Oklahoma City, where she briefly worked as a hospital clerk.

Union activities 
After being hired at the Kerr-McGee Cimarron Fuel Fabrication Site plant near Crescent, Oklahoma, in 1972, Silkwood joined the local Oil, Chemical & Atomic Workers Union and took part in a strike at the plant. After the strike ended, she was elected to the union's bargaining committee, the first woman to achieve that position at the Kerr-McGee plant. She was assigned to investigate health and safety issues. She discovered what she believed to be numerous violations of health regulations, including exposure of workers to contamination, faulty respiratory equipment and improper storage of samples. She believed the lack of sufficient shower facilities could increase the risk of employee contamination.

The Oil, Chemical, and Atomic Workers Union said that "the Kerr-McGee plant had manufactured faulty fuel rods, falsified product inspection records, and risked employee safety." It threatened litigation. In the summer of 1974, Silkwood testified to the Atomic Energy Commission (AEC) about having been contaminated, alleging that safety standards had slipped because of a production speedup. She was appearing with other union members.

On November 5, 1974, Silkwood performed a routine self-check and found that her body contained almost 400 times the legal limit for plutonium contamination. She was decontaminated at the plant and sent home with a testing kit to collect urine and feces for further analysis. Although there was plutonium on the inner portions of the gloves which she had been using, the gloves did not have any holes. This suggests the contamination had come not from inside the glovebox, but from some other source.

The next morning, as she headed to a union negotiation meeting, Silkwood again tested positive for plutonium, although she had performed only paperwork duties that morning. She was given a more intensive decontamination. On November 7, as she entered the plant, she was found to be dangerously contaminated, even expelling contaminated air from her lungs. A health physics team accompanied her back to her home and found plutonium traces on several surfaces, especially in the bathroom and the refrigerator. When the house was later stripped and decontaminated, some of her property had to be destroyed. Silkwood, her boyfriend Drew Stephens, and her roommate Dusty Ellis were sent to Los Alamos National Laboratory for in-depth testing to determine the extent of the contamination in their bodies.

Questions arose over how Silkwood became contaminated over this three-day period. She said the contamination in the bathroom may have occurred when she spilled her urine sample on the morning of November 7. This was consistent with the evidence that samples she took at home had extremely high levels of contamination, while samples taken in "fresh" jars at the plant and at Los Alamos showed much lower contamination.

She thought she had been contaminated at the plant. Kerr-McGee's management said that Silkwood had contaminated herself in order to portray the company in a negative light. According to Richard L. Rashke's book The Killing of Karen Silkwood (1981/2000), security at the plant was so lax that workers could easily smuggle out finished plutonium pellets. Rashke wrote that the soluble type of plutonium found in Silkwood's body came from a production area which she had not accessed for four months. The pellets had since been stored in the vault of the facility.

Death 

Silkwood said she had assembled documentation for her claims, including company papers. She decided to go public with this evidence, and contacted David Burnham, a New York Times journalist, who was interested in her story. On November 13, 1974, Silkwood left a union meeting at the Hub cafe in Crescent. Another attendee of that meeting later testified that Silkwood had a binder and a packet of documents with her at the cafe. Later that evening, Silkwood's body was found in her car, which had run off the road and struck a culvert on the east side of State Highway 74, 0.11 miles (180 m) south of the intersection with West Industrial Road. The car contained none of the documents she had been holding in the union meeting at the Hub cafe. She was pronounced dead at the scene in what was believed to be an accident. The trooper at the scene remembers that he found one or two tablets of the sedative methaqualone (Quaalude) in the car, and he remembers finding cannabis. The police report indicated that she fell asleep at the wheel. The coroner found 0.35 milligrams of methaqualone per 100 milliliters of blood at the time of her death — an amount almost twice the recommended dosage for inducing drowsiness.

Some journalists have theorized that Silkwood's car was rammed from behind by another vehicle, with the intent to cause an accident that would result in her death. Skid marks from Silkwood's car were present on the road, suggesting that she was trying to get back onto the road after being pushed from behind.

Investigators also noted damage on the rear of Silkwood's vehicle that, according to Silkwood's friends and family, had not been present before the accident. As the crash was entirely a front-end collision, it did not explain the damage to the rear of her vehicle. A microscopic examination of the rear of Silkwood's car showed paint chips that could have come only from a rear impact by another vehicle. Silkwood's family claimed to know of no accidents of any kind that Silkwood had had with the car, and that the 1974 Honda Civic she was driving was new when purchased and no insurance claims were filed on that vehicle.

Silkwood's relatives, too, confirmed that she had taken the missing documents to the union meeting and placed them on the seat beside her. According to her family, she had received several threatening phone calls very shortly before her death. Speculation about foul play has never been substantiated.

Because of concerns about contamination, the Atomic Energy Commission and the State Medical Examiner requested analysis of Silkwood's organs by the Los Alamos Tissue Analysis Program.

Public suspicions led to a federal investigation into plant security and safety. National Public Radio reported that this investigation had found that  of plutonium had been misplaced at the plant.

Kerr-McGee closed its nuclear fuel plants in 1975. The Department of Energy (DOE) reported the Cimarron plant as decontaminated and decommissioned in 1994.

PBS Frontline produced the program, Nuclear Reaction, which included aspects of the Silkwood story. Its website for the program includes a summary of details entitled "The Karen Silkwood Story", as printed November 23, 1995 in Los Alamos Science. The PBS program covered the risks of nuclear energy and raised questions about corporate accountability and responsibility.

Silkwood vs. Kerr-McGee 

Silkwood's father Bill and her children filed a lawsuit against Kerr-McGee for negligence on behalf of her estate. The trial was held in 1979 and lasted ten months, the longest up to that point in Oklahoma history. Gerry Spence was the chief attorney for the estate, other key attorneys were Daniel Sheehan, Arthur Angel, and James Ikard. William Paul was the chief attorney for Kerr-McGee. The estate presented evidence that the autopsy proved Silkwood was contaminated with plutonium at her death. To prove that the contamination was sustained at the plant, evidence was given by a series of witnesses who were former employees of the facility.

The defense relied on the expert witness Dr. George Voelz, a top-level scientist at Los Alamos. Voelz said that he believed the contamination in Silkwood's body was within legal standards. The defense later proposed that Silkwood was a troublemaker, who might have poisoned herself. Following the summation arguments, Judge Frank Theis told the jury, "[I]f you find that the damage to the person or property of Karen Silkwood resulted from the operation of this plant ... defendant Kerr-McGee Nuclear Corporation is liable...."

The jury rendered its verdict of US $505,000 in damages and US $10,000,000 in punitive damages. On appeal in federal court, the judgment was reduced to US $5,000, the estimated value of Silkwood's losses in property at her rental house, and reversing the award of punitive damages. In 1984, the U.S. Supreme Court restored the original verdict, in Silkwood v. Kerr-McGee Corp. 464 US 238 (1984), ruling that "the NRC's exclusive authority to set safety standards did not foreclose the use of state tort remedies." Although suggesting it would appeal on other grounds, Kerr-McGee settled out of court for US $1.38 million ($3.75 million in 2021 dollars), while admitting no liability.

Representation in other media 
According to Richard L. Rashke's book, The Killing of Karen Silkwood (2000), officials investigating Silkwood's death and Kerr-McGee's operations received death threats. One of the investigators disappeared under mysterious circumstances. One of the witnesses committed suicide shortly before she was to testify against the Kerr-McGee Corporation about the alleged happenings at the plant. Rashke wrote that the Silkwood family's legal team were followed, threatened with violence, and physically assaulted. Rashke suggested that the 20 kg (44 lbs) of plutonium missing from the plant had been stolen by "a secret underground plutonium-smuggling ring", in which many government agencies, including the highest levels of government and international intelligence agencies, namely the CIA, Britain's MI5, the Israeli Mossad, and a "shadowy group of Iranians" were involved. The book says that the United States covered up many details about Silkwood's death, and allegedly carried out her assassination.

The 1983 film Silkwood is an account of Silkwood's life and the events resulting from her activism, based on an original screenplay written by Nora Ephron and Alice Arlen. Meryl Streep played the title role and was nominated for an Academy Award and a BAFTA. Cher played Karen's best friend, Dusty Ellis, and was nominated for a Best Supporting Actress Academy Award. Mike Nichols was nominated for Best Director. Ephron and Arlen were nominated for Best Writing, Screenplay Written Directly for the Screen.

One of the six interlocking stories in the novel and film Cloud Atlas consists of a journalist Luisa Rey (played by Halle Berry) investigating wrongdoing at a fictional nuclear plant with the help of whistleblower Isaac Sachs (played by Tom Hanks). In a meta-reference to Karen Silkwood's life and work, Rey survives a mysterious car crash orchestrated to assassinate her, while Sachs is murdered by an airplane bomb.

See also

The Christic Institute
Hilda Murrell
Juanita Nielsen
Clarence Lushbaugh
List of nuclear whistleblowers
List of unsolved deaths
Nuclear accidents
Nuclear safety
Nuclear power
Nuclear fuel
Whistleblowers

References

Further reading

 (Hamill notes the lack of footnotes in the non-fiction book and suggests that lack weakens Kohn's case.)

External links 
 
 
 

1946 births
1974 deaths
American whistleblowers
American women trade unionists
Death conspiracy theories
Kerr-McGee
Lamar University alumni
People from Longview, Texas
People from Nederland, Texas
Road incident deaths in Oklahoma
Unsolved deaths in the United States
Trade unionists from Oklahoma